URW may refer to:
Unibail-Rodamco-Westfield
Union of Russian Workers
UnReal World, survival video game
Unrestricted Warfare, military strategy
Urawa Station, JR East station code
URW++ a typeface foundry
 Sop language, spoken in Papua New Guinea